Teymurabad may refer to:

Teymurabad, Golestan
Teymurabad, Lorestan
Teymurabad, Pol-e Dokhtar
Teymurabad, Selseleh
Teymurabad, Razavi Khorasan
Teymurabad, Sistan and Baluchestan
Teymurabad, West Azerbaijan
Teymurabad Rural District
Teymurabad District